In the Indian state of Jharkhand, films are produced in various regional and tribal languages including Kudmali, Hindi, Nagpuri, Khortha and Santali. Film industry in state of Jharkhand is also known as Jhollywood.

Since 2015, Government of Jharkhand is encouraging film shooting in State to highlight the natural beauty, religious place, culture of the state as well as to produce jobs by giving subsidy to film makers. New government of Congress-JMM alliance ended subsidy for regional cinema after coming to power in 2020.

In recent years several Hindi films have been shot in the state including M.S. Dhoni: The Untold Story, A Death in the Gunj, Ajab singh ki gajab kahani, Ranchi Diaries, Begum Jaan, Panchlait and Ilaka Kishoreganj. Several nagpuri film produced in recent year including Tor Bina, Mahuaa, Tor Chahat Mein , Mor Gaon Mor Desh and Phulmania. 

The upcoming hindi film Lohardaga will show issue of Naxalism and surrender policy in the State. The state also showcased in web and T.V series, e.g - Netflix's Jamtara - Sabka Number Ayega and Hoichoi's Dhanbad Blues. Ekta Kapoor T.V series, Kuch Toh Hai Tere Mere Darmiyan was based on Jamshedpur.

History 
The first feature film of Jharkhand was Aakarant made under the banner of drishyantar international, 1988. The first Nagpuri film was Sona Kar Nagpur (1992) produced and directed by Dhananjay Nath Tiwari.

Hindi films shot in Jharkhand
Kala Patthar, an Amitabh Bachchan starrer cult film was based on Chasnala mining disaster of 1975
Satyakam, a Dharmendra & Sharmila Tagore starrer film, shot in Ghatsila.
Hip Hip Hurray, a directorial debut film of Prakash Jha, shot at Ranchi & hill station, Netarhat
Udaan, a masterpiece screened at Cannes film festival, shot at Jamshedpur
A Death In The Gunj, a Konkana Sen Sharma starrer movie shot at McCluskieganj.
Gangs of Wasseypur, part 1 & 2, based on coal mafia feuds of Dhanbad
M.S. Dhoni: The Untold Story, biopic of M.S. Dhoni, shot at Ranchi and Jamshedpur
Bubble Gum, directed by Sanjivan Lal and shot at Jamshedpur
Begum Jaan, a multi-starrer film shot at Rajmahal (Sahebganj) and Dumka
Panchlait, based on Phanishwar Nath 'Renu''s story, shot at Deoghar
Ajab Singh Ki Gajab Kahani, biopic of Ajay Singh, a handicapped IRS officer from Jharkhand
Ranchi Diaries, a film starring Himansh Kohli shot at Ranchi
Koyelaanchal, a Suniel Shetty and Vinod Khanna starrer film shot in Hazaribagh & Ramgarh
Aadhaar, a Vineet Kumar starrer comedy film
Raahgir -The Wayfarers, an Adil Hussain starrer film shot in Ranchi & hill station, Netarhat
Sab Kushal Mangal, starring Akshaye Khanna, debut of Priyaank Sharma & Riva Kishan shot in Ranchi
One Day: Justice Delivered, an Anupam Kher & Esha Gupta starrer film shot in Ranchi
Gaon, an Omkar Das Manikpuri & Shishir Sharma starrer film based on original story
Ilaka Kishoreganj, film shot in Jharkhand
Ramrajya, a Govind Namdeo and Aman Preet Singh (brother of Rakul Preet Singh) starrer film, shot in Bokaro & Ranchi
Dil Bechara (earlier, Kizie or Manny), a Sushant Singh Rajput starrer film, shot at Jamshedpur
Nastik, an upcoming film starring Arjun Rampal, shot in Daltonganj
Banana, film directed by John Abraham & shot in Jamshedpur
Bansuri: The Flute, an Anurag Kashyap & Rituparna Sengupta starrer film
Birsa Munda, an upcoming biopic Hindi film directed by Tamil film director Pa. Ranjith.
Aa Bhi Ja O Piya, a Dev Sharma and Smriti Kashyap's debut starrer film

Bengali films shot in Jharkhand
Subarnarekha, a film directed by Ritwik Ghatak.
Ajantrik, a film directed by Ritwik Ghatak.
Aranyer Din Ratri, a Satyajit Ray directorial film shot in Palamu region
Oskar, a Priyanshu Chatterjee and Aparajita Adhya starring film
Agni Pariksha, an Uttam Kumar and Suchitra Sen starrer film shot at Topchanchi.
Chhuti, directorial debut of Arundhati Devi and based on Bimal Kar's Kharkuto

Film shootings of other industries
Ranchi, a Kannada film starring Prabhu Mundkur and Tota Roy Chowdhury.
Rupinder Gandhi 2 : The Robinhood, a Dev Kharoud and Jagjeet Sandhu starrer Punjabi film, shot at Ranchi

Notable people of Jharkhand cinema

Directors and producers 
 

Imtiaz Ali, well known Hindi film director
Amit Bose, Indian film director & editor
Sriram Dalton, Indian film producer & director
Pankaj Dubey, Indian screenwriters
Raj Kumar Gupta, Indian film director
Sanjivan Lal, Indian film director
Akashaditya Lama, Indian director & screenwriter
Aseem Mishra, Indian cinematographer
Bikas Mishra, Indian film director
Shomu Mukherjee, Indian director, producer & writer
Prem Prakash Modi, Indian filmmaker, actor & writer
Manish Mundra, Indian film producer
Nandlal Nayak, film director & music composer
Zeishan Quadri, director, actor & writer
Lal Vijay Shahdeo, Indian film writer, director & producer
Gul Bahar Singh, Indian filmmaker
Biju Toppo, Indian documentary filmmaker

Actors 
 

Krishna Bhardwaj, Indian T.V actor
Samit Bhanja, Bengali film actor
Bibhu Bhattacharya, Bengali film actor
Meiyang Chang, Indian actor & singer
Dipankar De, Bengali film actor
Dinesh Deva, Nagpuri actor and dancer
Raman Gupta, Nagpuri and Khortha film actor
Rajesh Jais, Indian film & T.V actor
Sanjeev Jaiswal, Indian actor
Neeraj Kabi, Indian actor
Deepak Lohar, Nagpuri film actor
R. Madhavan, Indian actor, writer & producer
Bunty Singh, Nagpuri film actor
Vikram Singh, Indian actor
Imran Zahid, Indian theatre actor

Actresses 
 

Pratyusha Banerjee, former T.V actress
Priyanka Chopra, actress, singer, producer and former Miss World
Deeba, Pakistani film actress
Rasika Dugal, Indian actress
Ishita Dutta, Indian film & T.V actress
Tanushree Dutta, Indian film actress & former Miss India
Auritra Ghosh, Indian film & theatre actress
Komal Jha, Indian film actress
Supriya Kumari, television actress
Shweta Basu Prasad, Indian film & T.V actress
Amrita Raichand, Indian actress
Meenakshi Seshadri, former Indian film actress
Sheena Shahabadi, Indian film actress
Pooja Singh, Indian T.V actress
Simone Singh, Indian film & T.V actress
Reecha Sinha, Indian film actress
Sumann, Indian actress
Tania, Punjabi film actress

Award 
Jharkhand International Film Festival Awards

See also 
Cinema of India
Khortha cinema
Nagpuri cinema
Santali cinema

References 

 
Jharkhand
Culture of Jharkhand